George Samuel Dixon, also known by the nickname of "Jumbo", was an English professional rugby league footballer who played in the 1920s and 1930s.

Playing career

Challenge Cup Final appearances
George Dixon played left-, i.e. number 11, in Keighley's 5-18 defeat by Widnes in the 1937 Challenge Cup Final during the 1936-37 season at Wembley Stadium, London on Saturday 8 May 1937, in front of a crowd of 47,699.

Club career

George Dixon made his début for Wigan, and scored a try in the 33-18 victory over Leeds at Central Park, Wigan on Saturday 7 September 1929, he scored his last try for Wigan in the 30-26 victory over Rochdale Hornets  at Athletic Grounds, Rochdale on Saturday 18 March 1933, and he played his last match for Wigan in the 6-22 defeat by Warrington at Wilderspool Stadium, Warrington on Saturday 26 August 1933.

References

External links
Search for "Dixon" at rugbyleagueproject.org

Broughton Rangers players
English rugby league players
Keighley Cougars players
People from Broughton, Greater Manchester
Rugby league players from Salford
Rugby league second-rows
Wigan Warriors players